Nhoabe is a genus of snout moths described by Pierre Viette in 1953.

Species
Nhoabe marionalis P. Leraut, 2006
Nhoabe millotalis Viette, 1953
Nhoabe minetalis P. Leraut, 2006
Nhoabe mocquerysalis Viette, 1953
Nhoabe privatalis Viette, 1960
Nhoabe ratovosonalis P. Leraut, 2006
Nhoabe sambiranoalis P. Leraut, 2006
Nhoabe viettealis (Marion, 1955)

References

Pyralinae
Pyralidae genera